DXIF (729 AM) Bombo Radyo is a radio station owned and operated by Bombo Radyo Philippines through its licensee Newsounds Broadcasting Network. Its studio is located at Bombo Radyo Broadcast Center, Palad Bldg. Corrales Ave., Cagayan de Oro, and its transmitter is located at Brgy. Taboc, Opol, Misamis Oriental.

It was formerly situated on 1188 kHz from its inception on December 30, 1987, to April 22, 2011. It went back on air on its current frequency a couple of days later. On April 25, 2011, DXRU was launched on the former's old frequency of 1188 kHz, and moving of DXIF Bombo Radyo Cagayan de Oro is now on 729 kHz since April 25, 2012. Its current frequency was originally owned by P.N. Roa Broadcasting System under the call letters DXOR from 1970 to the 2005.

References

Radio stations in Cagayan de Oro
Radio stations established in 1987